Les Voyages du tortillard or The Secret Railroad was a series of 52 (or possibly 61) animated shorts made in Montreal, Quebec, Canada. Episodes last 5 minutes each.

It was originally recorded in English at Place D'Youville in Montreal then subsequently dubbed into French. It was produced by Peter Saunders and Danielle Marleau for their "Les Films du Train Secret" animated studio. 

Created in 1977, it aired in French on Radio-Canada between 1980 and 1981. It was rebroadcast in the late 1980s and early 1990s on Canal Famille as a segment airing typically after Inspector Gadget and The Raccoons. The English version aired in Canada on TVOntario and on Global Television.  It also aired  in the United States on The Great Space Coaster, and in New Zealand, in the early 1980s.

Characters

Simon 
The main character is a young boy named Simon who discovers a magical steam locomotive hidden in the basement of his apartment building. Acting as the engineer Simon uses the locomotive to travel on many magical adventures.

Mr. George T. Passenger  
Joining Simon every episode is Monsieur Globetrotteur (Mr. Passenger), an old man who awaited the coming of the train for many a decade before Simon finally arrived.

Mélanie 
With Mr. Passenger is Mélanie (Melanie), Mr. Passenger's cat who always rides atop his long stove pipe hat.

Stella 
Each episode also features a character named Stella, a girl with star shaped hair. Stella's character changes from episode to episode (a mermaid in an underwater episode for example) but she always has her star shaped hair.

Theme Song Lyrics 

When you are feeling blue,

When you are feeling down.

Just do what Simon did;

Go underground.

Down there in the dark,

You hear a happy sound.

It's the secret railroad.

Adventure bound!

You better climb on board

the train's about to leave.

All you need is a passenger.

Your tickets, please!

English Episode Names 
According to one source, these are the episode names: 
 A cat's eye view
 A funny thing happened on the way to the railroad
 Animal trackers
 Back track
 Blue...genies...blues!
 Bridging the gaps
 Double Simon or quits
 Elementary my dear passenger
 Engine ills
 Fitting the parts
 Flights of fancy
 Ghost train
 Go wild west young man
 Gold rush railroad
 Hot the only way to travel
 I spy with my little train
 Invisible...man!
 Joly Roger railroad
 Mer-train
 Mr.Passenger's bag
 Near myths
 Next stop wherever
 Out of seasons
 Railroad puzzles
 Railway rhythms
 Reversible railroad
 Robin Dude
 Robot riddles?
 Rocky ride
 Safari so good
 Saturday night steam
 Scaredy cat
 Simon's secret
 Simon, Melanie, Stella, Mr.Passenger
 Slap control stick
 Smoke signals
 Spaced out Liliput
 Special railroad effects
 Stationary passenger
 Stealing the show
 Stella in space
 Stellapatra
 Super Sam
 Talking the night train
 The abonimable snow child
 The great train game
 The last train in toyland
 The musical ride
 The spirit of the railroad
 The talking train
 Things that go bump in the tunnel
 Time machine train
 Tooth tracks
 Train bug
 Train in training
 Trainsylvania
 U.F.O...Oh!...Oh!
 Unwelcome on board
 Where there's smoke there's a dragon
 Which way switch
 Whistle stop tours

References

External links
Fanpage featuring still images
Some additional info from Toonarific.com
A forum discussion about the Secret Railroad on Cartoon Decades 
Episode information on Dessin-Animes
A blog collection of Memories from the 70s and 80s
IMDB Entry

1980s Canadian animated television series
1980 Canadian television series debuts
Television shows filmed in Quebec
Canadian children's animated adventure television series